This is a list of islands in Washington, D.C.

Columbia Island
East Potomac Park—the largest island in Washington, D.C.
Goose Island
Heritage Island
Kingman Island
Little Island
Ripps Island—historical
Theodore Roosevelt Island
Three Sisters
Tiber Island—historical

See also
List of islands on the Potomac River

References

External links
 

 
District
 
Islands